Unije is an island in Croatia. It is part of the Cres-Lošinj archipelago, which is situated at the northern portion of the Adriatic Sea. Unije is the third largest island of the archipelago. Low hills abut the shoreline and are covered with Mediterranean evergreen macchia trees and olive trees.

The only settlement on the island of Unije bears the same name. It is a typical fishing and farming village which contains 280 houses. The houses are positioned on a gentle slope located on a western cove of the island. Because of its openness, the port of Unije does not provide good shelter during strong storms, especially those originating from the west and northwest. During severe weather, small fishing and pleasure boats have to be pulled out onto the pebbly beach while larger boats need to be moored in one of the sheltered bays on the eastern side of the island.

The year round population of Unije is less than 85 residents and grows to more than 400 residents during the summer tourist season. Passenger ship service provides daily connections to the nearby islands of Susak and Mali Lošinj as well as the mainland cities of Rijeka and Pula. Unije also has an airport that serves private and commercial aircraft.  A sky bus service connects Unije to Mali Lošinj.

A recently released book by Llumina Press, entitled The History and Families of Unije: a compiled history and family genealogies for the island of Unije, Croatia outlines the history for the island and provides detailed family genealogies for those families that have lived on the island for over 100 years.

References

External links

Publications for the islands of Losinj, Susak, and Unije

Islands of Croatia
Islands of the Adriatic Sea
Landforms of Primorje-Gorski Kotar County